River crab may refer to:
Chinese mitten crab, Eriocheir sinensis, sometimes called the Chinese River Crab
Potamonautes perlatus, the Cape river crab of South Africa
Potamonautes reidi, Reid's river crab
Potamonautes sidneyi, the Natal river crab of South Africa
Liberonautes grandbassa, Grandbassa river crab
Liberonautes lugbe, Lugbe river crab
Liberonautes nanoides, dwarf river crab
Other species of freshwater crab
River crab (Internet slang), also often referred to as the doctrine of "Harmonious society", is a euphemism for Internet censorship in the People's Republic of China and a form of protest against such censorship

Animal common name disambiguation pages